Haydon School is a mixed secondary school and sixth form in the Northwood Hills area of the London Borough of Hillingdon, Greater London, for students aged 11 to 18. On 1 April 2011, Haydon School became an Academy.

History 
The school was formed in September 1977 from the union of St Nicholas's Grammar School for Boys and St Mary's Grammar School for Girls.

It was named after the local family, as was Haydon Hall. Alice Spencer, Countess of Derby, had the hall built in 1630.

Languages 
Haydon is a designated language college teaching students foreign languages. Students entering the school are given three languages to learn until the end of Year eight; the language can only be French, Italian and Spanish. The school offered Japanese, Mandarin Chinese and German classes to students until 2018 when they were unable to continue teaching the languages due to lack of teachers able to teach the subjects.

The campus

The Peter Woods Building 
The Peter Woods building was opened on Thursday 9 July 2009 by former headmaster and namesake Peter Woods.

Sixth Form Building 
Haydon School has over 500 students in its sixth form. It offers advanced level courses on site.

Notable alumni

St. Nicholas Grammar School for Boys
 Stuart Baird — film editor and director. 
 Felix Dennis — publisher, poet and philanthropist. Originally of Oz magazine fame. 
 John Henderson — film and TV director. Credits include The Borrowers and Spitting Image.
 Tony Hymas — musician/arranger. Worked with Jeff Beck and others for many years.
 Baron Rosser — trade union leader. General Secretary of the Transport Salaried Staffs' Association from 1989 to 2004.
 Gary Tibbs — musician and actor. Played bass guitar with The Vibrators, Roxy Music and  Adam and The Ants.

Haydon School 
 Luisa Bradshaw-White — actress
 Heather Couper — astronomer
 Fearne Cotton — presenter
 Mark Paterson — Oscar and BAFTA winning sound engineer

References

External links 
 
 Haydon Eco Club website

Secondary schools in the London Borough of Hillingdon
Academies in the London Borough of Hillingdon
Educational institutions established in 1977
1977 establishments in England

Eastcote